Vincent Pajot (born 19 August 1990) is a French professional footballer who currently plays for Annecy. He primarily plays as a defensive midfielder. Pajot was a France youth international having earned caps at under-20 and under-21 level.

Club career
Having come into the Stade Rennes youth team, Pajot went on to make 83 league appearances for the club, scoring on one occasion. This followed having a loan spell at Boulogne, where he made his professional debut in a Coupe de la Ligue match against Nantes.

After struggling for a place in the Rennes B team for two years, on 2 June 2015, Pajot signed for Saint-Étienne for a free transfer on a four-year deal. He went on to make more than 50 appearances for them.

On 6 July 2022, Pajot moved to Annecy.

References

External links
 
 
 
 

1990 births
Living people
People from Domont
Footballers from Val-d'Oise
Association football midfielders
French footballers
Stade Rennais F.C. players
US Boulogne players
AS Saint-Étienne players
Angers SCO players
FC Metz players
FC Annecy players
Ligue 1 players
Ligue 2 players
France under-21 international footballers
France youth international footballers